Pūpūkea is a community and census-designated place (CDP) in the Koolauloa District on the island of Oahu, City & County of Honolulu, Hawaii, United States. In Hawaiian, pūpūkea means "white shell".  As of the 2020 census, the CDP had a population of 5,130. The Koolauloa District ends at Waimea Bay, with the Waialua District extending south and westward.

Pūpūkea is a popular area on Oahu's North Shore for living and for visiting.  The best known surfing sites of Velzyland, Sunset (at Sunset Beach Park), Kammieland, Pūpūkea, Ehukai, Pipeline (these latter two off adjacent Ehukai Beach Park and Banzai Beach) and lesser breaks are arrayed off this shore.  Popular diving and snorkeling areas known as Three Tables and Sharks Cove are located at Pūpūkea Beach Park. At the southwest end of Pūpūkea is Waimea Bay, with one of the most popular beaches on the island forming the shore at Waimea Beach Park.

Popular residential areas here include the beach lots at Sunset Beach and the uplands of Pūpūkea. As the properties in this area were subdivided in the 1950s and 60s and classified then as country, the lots in the uplands were all measured out in 1 acre or greater parcels. The biggest drawback to living in this part of the island, however, is the considerable driving distance of 37 miles (60 km) to Honolulu.

The U.S. postal code for Pūpūkea and the communities of Waialee, Sunset Beach, Lihilani, Waimea, and Kawailoa is 96712.

Geography 
Pūpūkea is located at 21°40'11" North, 158°2'58" West (21.669740, -158.049349), along Kamehameha Highway (State Rte. 83) west to southwest from Kawela Bay and northeast from Haleiwa.

Due to its geographic location, this area gets three times the amount of rain per year Honolulu receives. It rains on average on 247 days a year with 54.7 inches of rainfall here, whereas it only rains on 89 days with 17.1 inches of rainfall annually in Honolulu.

The total area is 44.17% water, consisting of that portion of the Pacific Ocean (possibly with Waimea Bay) included in the CDP.

Demographics 

As of the 2000 Census, there were 4,250 people, 1,455 households, and 937 families residing in the CDP. The racial makeup of the CDP was 55.95% White, 0.24% Black or African American, 0.66% Native American, 14.56% Asian, 6.52% Pacific Islander, 1.18% from other races, and 20.89% from two or more races.  8.38% of the population were Hispanic or Latino of any race.

There were 1,455 households, out of which 32.8% had children under the age of 18 living with them, 48.0% were married couples living together, 10.3% had a female householder with no husband present, and 35.6% were non-families. 18.7% of all households were made up of individuals, and 3.4% had someone living alone who was 65 years of age or older.  The average household size was 2.92 and the average family size was 3.35.

In the CDP the population was spread out, with 23.6% under the age of 18, 10.1% from 18 to 24, 34.7% from 25 to 44, 24.3% from 45 to 64, and 7.3% who were 65 years of age or older.  The median age was 34 years.  For every 100 females there were 114.6 males.  For every 100 females age 18 and over, there were 119.8 males.

The median income for a household in the CDP was $56,146, and the median income for a family was $62,375. Males had a median income of $41,015 versus $32,332 for females. The per capita income for the CDP was $25,682.  15.2% of the population and 11.4% of families were below the poverty line.  Out of the total population, 15.8% of those under the age of 18 and 6.1% of those 65 and older were living below the poverty line.

Education
The Hawaii Department of Education operates the public schools. Sunset Beach Elementary School is located in the CDP.
Pupukea Schoolhouse is another educational option (non-DOE/public), starting in 2022 in upland Pupukea.

References

External links

Census-designated places in Honolulu County, Hawaii
Beaches of Oahu
Surfing locations in Hawaii
Populated coastal places in Hawaii